Yeongdong may refer to:

Yeongdong (region), a region of eastern Gangwon, Korea
Yeongdong County, a county in North Chungcheong, South Korea
Yeongdong station, a Gyeongbu Line railway station in Yeongdong County
Yeongdong, a historical name meaning "east of Yeongdeungpo", referring to the modern-day Gangnam region of Seoul
Yeongdong Bridge, one of the bridges over the Han River

See also

Youngdong University in Yeongdong County